The Ghana Optometric Association (GOA) is the professional and regulatory body responsible for the development of the Optometry profession in Ghana.

History
The association was formed in 1997 to unite the optometry professionals as well as provide a united front to promote the activities of member.

Executives

Executives
Five executives lead the GOA. It is headed by the late Dr Julius Darko as President of GOA, then subsequently Dr.Samuel O.Asiedu.
Dr Remi Ninkpe is the current president.

Activities
The association in 2009 passed a resolution mandating all optometrists wanting to be members to write a professional exam. Upon successfully passing the exam, the certification required to practice optometry in Ghana is awarded. The group has about 200 members. In 2010 the Ghana Optometric Association along with the Kwame Nkrumah University of Science and Technology's Faculty of Distance Learning rolled out a two-year program to offer all members of GOA who did not have the Doctor of Optometry degree to enroll for it.

See also
Eyecare in the Western Region (Ghana)
Optometry in Ghana
Optometry in the Western Region (Ghana)
Department of Optometry, KNUST
Optometry, UCC, Ghana

References

External links
 Ghana Optometric Association homepage

Eye care in Ghana
Medical and health organisations based in Ghana